South Allegheny Middle/High School is part of the South Allegheny School District located in Allegheny County, Pennsylvania. The building houses both middle school students (grades 7 and 8) and high school students (grades 9 through 12). The school serves students from Glassport, Port Vue, Liberty, Lincoln, and parts of Elizabeth.

The school provides all of its students with curriculum aligned to Pennsylvania standards, as well as the opportunity to attend Steel Center Vocational Technical School.

History

District

South Allegheny school district was formed in 1966 with the merger of Port Vue-Liberty School District, Lincoln Boro School District and Glassport School District.

Mascot and school colors
With the announcement of the planned Port-Vue Liberty and Glassport merger; there was speculation as to which school's mascot and colors would be used for the new South Allegheny School District. Port Vue-Liberty had their royal blue and gold Bulldogs. Glassport had their red and black Gladiators. It is thought that the mascot was determined by the outcome of a football game between Port-Vue Liberty and Glassport in which the Glassport Gladiators won. The colors are thought to be determined in a similar way with the losing team's colors being chosen as South Allegheny's school colors.

Glassport Memorial Stadium
Glassport Memorial Stadium was officially opened to the public on October 16, 1950, and as of 2010 is still used by South Allegheny. On the night of the $225,000 stadium's opening, 4243 tickets were sold—though the stadium only seats 4167—for the field's maiden football match between Glassport High School and Elizabeth High School. The Glassport Gladiators won the game, 26-6.

Athletics
South Allegheny High School competes in the Pennsylvania Interscholastic Athletic Association (PIAA). It also is a member of the Western Pennsylvania Interscholastic Athletic League (WPIAL).
 
Baseball
Basketball
Cheerleading
Golf
Football
Soccer
Softball
Track
Volleyball (girls)
Wrestling

Football
The football team is a member of the Class AA Interstate Conference and finished the 2008 season at 5-5, the first "non-losing" season since 1993.

Notable Athletes
Fran Mallick, defensive end & All Pro Player for the Pittsburgh Steelers
Jesse James, tight end with Penn State, the Pittsburgh Steelers, and the Detroit Lions

Extracurricular student activities

Band
The South Allegheny Band participates in many local activities including community parades and concerts. The band is noted as an organization that has achieved excellence and credit for its students, school, and community. Each year the South Allegheny Band performs at several non-competitive band festivals, and for the past 39 years have hosted its own band festival, traditionally on the weekend after Labor Day. The band has also performed at Steelers and Pirates games, in addition to many Pittsburgh parades and college football games. The band will travel to Walt Disney World Resort in Florida to participate in the "Celebrate a Dream Come True" parade as part of Magic Music Days in the Magic Kingdom theme park.

Chorus
Consisting of students in grades 5 through 12, the South Allegheny Chorus meets during the regular school day to learn and rehearse songs for their winter and spring concerts, as well as public performances. The chorus makes frequent field trips to music-related events such as musical theater performances in Pittsburgh.

DeNobis (high school yearbook)
The yearbook committee, grades 11 and 12, meets daily during the regular school day, and occasionally after school, to produce a memorable high school yearbook.

Theater
1997: "The Music Man" (musical)
1998: "Annie" (musical) 
1999: "Hello, Dolly!" (musical) 
2000: "The Wizard of Oz" (musical)
2001: "Bye Bye Birdie" (musical)
2002: "Footloose" (musical)
2003: "Cinderella" (musical)
2004: "A Funny Thing Happened on the Way to the Forum" (musical)
2005: "Honk!" (musical)
2006: "You're A Good Man, Charlie Brown" (musical)
2007: "Harvey" (play)
2014: Dorothy and the Wonder Wizard of Cos (Junior Play)
2014: The Court Caine Mutiny (Senior Play)
2014: "Grease" (Musical)
2015: Alice and The Maltese Flamingo (Junior Play)
2015: Our Town (Senior Play)
2015: "Into the Woods" (Musical)
2016: Once Upon a Happy Ending (Junior Play)
2016: A Midsummer Night’s Dream. (Senior Play)
2016: "The Addams Family" (Musical)
2017: Dahtan Alley (Junior Play)
2017: Beauty and The Beast (Musical)
2017: Medea (Senior Play)
2018: Behind the Curtain (Junior Play)
2018: Little Shop of Horrors (Musical)

SATV
SATV South Allegheny Television is a school news program intended to inform the general student population of school events and rewards, provide fun programming alternatives, and video taping major events, as well as provide students interested in the communication industry an opportunity to learn the basics of video taping, editing, creative development, and communication technology.

Science Fair
The Science Fair Team goes to two Science Fairs a year. The team consists of a mere twenty people, but for the past 24 years they have always taken home awards.

Science Society
The Science Society makes regular field trips to various local attractions such as the Carnegie Science Center, Pittsburgh Zoo & PPG Aquarium, Carnegie Museum of Natural History, and National Aviary in Pittsburgh, among others.  Additionally, an out of state trip is conducted.

Student Council
Student Council is a group of students whose main priorities are to encourage school spirit and pride. Some activities governed by the student council include the homecoming parade, bonfire, and Spirit Week; the annual Winter Formal; White-Out Day;

Class officers
Class Officers are the leaders of each high school class.  There are a president, vice president, secretary, and treasurer for each class.  The officers design and engineer events such as the senior banquet, the concession stand at high school football games, Breakfast with Santa, prom, and Powder Puff.

Peer Helpers
Peer Helpers is a group of trained young adults who will listen, offer support and reference materials to guide others toward a healthy living.  This will assist in creating a more emotionally supportive environment for the school and community.

References

External links
 South Allegheny School District
 South Allegheny Academic and Athletic Association
 South Allegheny High School Band

Educational institutions established in 1966
Public high schools in Pennsylvania
Schools in Allegheny County, Pennsylvania
Public middle schools in Pennsylvania
Education in Pittsburgh area
1966 establishments in Pennsylvania